Rosemary Cove is an American sculptor. She was born on January 11, 1936, in New York City.

Rosemary Cove is best known for her work with Corten Steel, clay and wax. She also creates painting and collage. Her subject is primarily the female form. Cove has received a Ford Foundation Grant, National Endowment for the Arts Residency Grant, New York State Council for the Arts Grant, and National Endowment for the Arts Invitational Residency. In 2005, the Ann Norton Sculpture Gardens held a major retrospective of Rosemary Cove’s sculpture and collage.

Rosemary Cove lives and works in New York City.

References

External links 
Rosemary Cove website

20th-century American painters
21st-century American painters
Modern painters
Artists from New York (state)
1936 births
Parsons School of Design alumni
Living people
20th-century American women artists
21st-century American women artists
American women painters